When Empty Hearts Are Filled is a 1915 American silent short drama film directed by Archer MacMackin starring Louise Lester, Vivian Rich, and Harry von Meter.

External links

1915 films
1915 drama films
Silent American drama films
American silent short films
American black-and-white films
1915 short films
1910s American films